David Umaru (born 26 July 1959) is a Nigerian Politician, and was the Senator representing Niger East Senatorial District of Niger State at the Nigerian 7th National Assembly and 8th National Assembly.

Early life and education
Umaru was born in Kuta, headquarters of Shiroro Local Government in Niger State. He attended Methodist Primary School, Zaria. He proceeded to St. Paul’s College, Zaria. In 1980, he obtained his LLB at the Ahmadu Bello University, Zaria. He was called to bar at the Nigerian Law School, Lagos.

Polictical career
Umaru participated and won the March 28, 2015 Niger East senatorial district senatorial election and was a member of the Nigerian 8th National Assembly.
On February 7, 2019, the Federal High Court, Abuja, removed David Umaru, as the Niger East Senatorial district candidate for the All Progressives Congress (APC) in the February 23, 2019 election, agreeing that Sani Mohammed Musa was the declared winner of the primary election the APC conducted in the senatorial district on October 2, 2018.

On 8 April 2019 the Court of Appeal in Abuja reversed the judgement of the Federal High Court in Abuja which sacked Senator David Umaru as the All Progressives Congress(APC) candidate for the Niger East senatorial district and he was declared the senator representing Niger East.

On 14 June 2019, the Nigerian Supreme Court in Abuja declared Sani Mohammed Musa the winner of the February 23, 2019 election for the Senate held in the Niger-East Senatorial District of Niger State, the court set aside the judgment of the Court of Appeal, Abuja, the valid candidate of the All Progressives Congress (APC), that won the election removing David Umaru .

References

People from Niger State
Living people
1959 births
20th-century Nigerian lawyers
Ahmadu Bello University alumni
All Progressives Congress politicians